Tamamschjania is a genus of flowering plants belonging to the family Apiaceae.

Its native range is Turkey to Caucasus.

Species:

Tamamschjania lazica

References

Apiaceae
Apiaceae genera